Ninia franciscoi, the Simla coffee snake, is a species of snake in the family Colubridae.  The species is native to Trinidad.

References

Ninia
Snakes of South America
Reptiles of Trinidad and Tobago
Endemic fauna of Trinidad and Tobago
Reptiles described in 2014